Ralph Wakley (born December 11, 1941) is an American biathlete. He competed in the 20 km individual event at the 1968 Winter Olympics.

References

1941 births
Living people
American male biathletes
Olympic biathletes of the United States
Biathletes at the 1968 Winter Olympics
Sportspeople from Logan, Utah